Jeff Smith is an American martial arts instructor, best known as the former seven-time PKA World Light Heavy Weight Karate Champion. One of his title defense matches was on the undercard for the Ali vs. Frazier "Thrilla in Manila." 

Jeff Smith operated martial arts schools in Virginia where he taught Tae Kwon Do, in which he holds the title of grandmaster. Jeff Smith received his first black belt and all of his black belt ranks through ninth degree from Jhoon_Rhee.

On April 6, 2007, Jeff Smith was inducted into the Taekwondo Hall of Fame.

On June 15, 2013, Jeff Smith was the first to be presented the Joe Lewis Eternal Warrior Award, along with Bill "Superfoot" Wallace and Chuck Norris at the Battle of Atlanta World Karate Championship.

On June 16, 2016, Jeff Smith was promoted to the rank of Grand Master—10th Degree Black Belt—by the Professional Karate Commission at the Battle of Atlanta World Karate Championship XLVIII. His promotion was presented by Grand Masters Glenn Keeney, Allen Steen, Pat Johnson and Pat Burleson.

On August 4, 2017, Grand Master Jeff Smith was featured on the cover of the Who's Who in the Martial Arts Legends Edition and in the Lifetime Achievement section.

Jeff Smith is the COO and Director of Instruction for Mile High Karate and Martial Arts Wealth Mastery, a nationally recognized martial arts franchise and consulting company.

Jeff Smith is the President of Sports Operations for PKA Worldwide.

References

External links
Personal web page

Living people
American male karateka
American male kickboxers
American male taekwondo practitioners
Light heavyweight kickboxers
1963 births